Susanne Cramer (3 December 1936 – 7 January 1969) was a German film and television actress. She was born in Frankfurt, Germany, and died in Hollywood, California, of pneumonia, at age 32.

Biography
At the age of 20, Cramer married the 37-year-old actor Hermann Nehlsen, who pushed her film ambitions. The marriage failed and the actress entered into a relationship with Claus Biederstaedt, whom she had met in 1956 while filming the literary adaptation Kleines Zelt und große Liebe. This relationship also failed; in February 1958, the Frankfurter Abendpost reported that the then 21-year-old actress had attempted suicide, which she denied. 

Cramer had a six-year career in American television, starting with a 1963 episode of The Dakotas, and ending with a 1969 episode of The Guns of Will Sonnett.

In between, she was in 24 other television roles. Among them were two appearances on The Rogues in 1964, two appearances on the Kraft Suspense Theater in 1965, two appearances on Burke's Law in 1964-65, and two appearances on The Man from U.N.C.L.E..

She also made appearances in 1964 and 1965 on two episodes of Perry Mason: "The Case of a Place Called Midnight" and as murderer Gerta Palmer in "The Case of the Fugitive Fraulein".

Susanne Cramer fell ill a good two years later with Hong Kong flu, which was rampant in the U.S., and died at the age of just 32 in a private clinic — officially due to pneumonia.  However, there are numerous rumors about her death, ranging from suicide to a medical malpractice. Her grave is located at Forest Lawn Memorial Park (Hollywood Hills).

Filmography

References

External links
 
 

1936 births
1969 deaths
German film actresses
Actors from Frankfurt
People from Hesse-Nassau
German television actresses
20th-century German actresses
Deaths from pneumonia in California
German expatriates in the United States